Lucio Dalla (1979) is an album by the Italian singer-songwriter Lucio Dalla.

The album
The second LP for which he wrote both lyrics and music, Lucio Dalla was released by RCA Italia, and is generally considered among his finest works. It contains some of his most popular songs, such as "Anna e Marco", "Milano" and "L'anno che verrà". "Cosa sarà", written with Ron, is sung together with Francesco De Gregori.

Personnel

Track listing 
All songs by Lucio Dalla, except "Cosa sarà", music co-written with Ron.

"L'ultima luna" (5:40) 
"Stella di mare" (5:56) 
"La signora" (3:59) 
"Milano" (3:28) 
"Anna e Marco" (3:41) 
"Tango" (3:56) 
"Cosa sarà" (4:20) ft. Francesco De Gregori
"Notte" (3:37)
"L'anno che verrà" (4:24)

References

1979 albums
Lucio Dalla albums
RCA Records albums
Italian-language albums